A Strawberry festival is an event and celebration in many towns in North America.  In most instances, areas around these towns are, or have been, deeply involved in the production and marketing of strawberries, and the festivals are usually held in late spring around the time of the strawberry harvest.  Such festivals generally involve a parade and other community events. People come from all different places yearly. They get to enjoy the environment and consume strawberries in a variety of ways. The Strawberry Festival has also been around for many years, and as of today they continue to celebrate it in many towns in North America. Each town is unique with their strawberry festival celebration.

Festivals by country

United States

Arroyo Grande, California – Memorial Day weekend 
Assonet, Massachusetts – Father's Day
Belleville, Michigan – National Strawberry Festival
Bellevue, Washington
Billings, Montana Strawberry Festival
Buckhannon, West Virginia – West Virginia Strawberry Festival
Wisconsin 
Cabot, Arkansas
Chassell, Michigan
Crawfordsville, Indiana
Dayton, Tennessee – Tennessee Strawberry Festival (Dayton, Tennessee)
Fort Mill, South Carolina
Garden Grove, California
Humboldt, Tennessee – Strawberry Festival (Humboldt, Tennessee)
Lebanon, Oregon – Strawberry Festival (Lebanon, Oregon)
Lahaska, Pennsylvania – Peddler's Village Strawberry Festival
Lincolnville, Maine – Strawberry Festival (Lincolnville, Maine)
Long Grove, Illinois
Los Gatos, California
Mattituck, New York– 2nd week of June
Marysville, Washington – 3rd week of June
Newark, Ohio
North Canton, Connecticut, at the North Canton Community United Methodist Church, Saturday before Father's Day
Owego, New York – 3rd Saturday in June
Oxnard Plain – California Strawberry Festival, 3rd weekend in May
Pasadena, Texas  – May 16, 17 and 18, 2008
Ponchatoula, Louisiana – April 3–5
Plant City, Florida – the Florida Strawberry Festival,   
Portland, Tennessee – Strawberry Festival (Portland, Tennessee)
Poteet, Texas – Strawberry Festival
Pungo, Virginia Strawberry Festival
Rehoboth, Massachusetts – First Sunday in June
Sandy Spring, Maryland
Santa Maria, California
Schodack, New York – Strawberry Festival (Schodack, New York)
South Berwick, Maine
South Windsor, Connecticut
Stilwell, Oklahoma
Troy, Ohio  –  Strawberry Festival (Troy, Ohio)
Vashon Island, Washington
Vanceboro, North Carolina

Brazil
 Brasilia
 Gravatá
 Nova friburgo

Australia
Cleveland, Queensland (1965–2001)

Philippines
La Trinidad, Benguet – In March 2015, 6,000 slices of strawberry cake were served as part of the events at this municipality's Strawberry Festival. The cakes for the slices were prepared using fresh strawberries.

Canada

Finland
Suonenjoki – In July, the so-called "the Strawberry Town" hosts an annual "Strawberry Carnival".

India
 Panchgani

References

External links

http://www.santamariafairpark.com/events/2019/2019-santa-maria-strawberry-festival
https://strawberryfestival.org/

Fruit festivals